San Gervasio is an archaeological site of the pre-Columbian Maya civilization, located in the northern third of the island of Cozumel off the northeastern coast of the Yucatán Peninsula, in what is now the Mexican state of Quintana Roo.  San Gervasio's pre-Hispanic name was Tantun Cuzamil, Mayan for Flat Rock in the place of the Swallows. The ruins were once a hub of worship of the goddess Ix Chel, an aged deity of childbirth, fertility, medicine, and weaving. Pre-Columbian Maya women would try to travel to San Gervasio and make offerings at least once in their lives. In 1560, the Spanish historian, Diego Lopez de Cogolludo, wrote: "The pilgrims arrive at Cozumel for the fulfillment of their vows to offer their sacrifices, to ask help for their needs, and for the mistaken adoration of their false gods."  The bishop of Yucatán, Diego de Landa, wrote in 1549 that the Maya "held Cozumel in the same veneration as we have for pilgrimages to Jerusalem and Rome, and so they used to go to visit and offer presents there, as we do to holy places; and if they did not go themselves, they always sent their offerings."

Overview

Although most of the stone structures at San Gervasio now lack their roofs and upper portions of their walls, archaeologists from Harvard and the University of Arizona compiled detailed plans of the remains in the early 1970s that allowed them to create reconstructed views of these buildings.  Renderings of these reconstructions are illustrated in the guidebook offered for sale by the Cozumel Parks and Museum Foundation (FPMCQROO), an agency of the Mexican State of Quintana Roo and the agency responsible for the upkeep and maintenance of the State park that surrounds the National Monument of the ruins of San Gervasio, which is administered separately by the National Institute of Anthropology and History (INAH).  More information about the archaeological park, including hours of operation, entrance fees, and directions are available on the FPMCQROO website CozumelParks.com

The park is a wildlife refuge and the local iguana population has become quite habituated to humans.  Although other species of lizards abound, they are not so trusting.  Likewise, the peccaries and coatis that are sometimes spotted as they pass through the ruins tend to keep a safe distance from the tourists.

The ruins cover 4 districts spread out over several square kilometers, but only certain parts of District 1 are open to the public.   Most of the District 1 buildings that are accessible lie within or very near the District 1 Central Plaza Group.

History

The first European to visit San Gervasio was Juan de Grijalva, who discovered the island for the Spanish in 1518.  The second group of European visitors came with the Hernán Cortés expedition, which stopped by the island on the way to Veracruz in 1519.  Both groups were received well by the Maya of Cozumel, and Cortez even wrote a letter for them to present to any Spaniards that came to the island in the future, stating that “there is no gold here and these are peaceful people.”  The letter did not help much, however, when the Panfilo de Narvaez expedition arrived in 1520.  Several of the expedition’s crewmembers were sick with smallpox. The sickness ran rampant across the island.  There have been three mass graves discovered at San Gervasio where these smallpox victims were buried, along with their glass trade-beads given to them by the Spanish.

Structures

Las Manitas

Meaning: Little Hands

Constructed during: Terminal-Classic (1000-1200 AD)

Location: East of the District 1 Central Plaza

Las Manitas was the residence of the halach unik, or the Mayan ruler of Cozumel during the Terminal Classic Period.  It has an outer room that was his residence and an inner sanctum that was his personal shrine.  The name of the building comes from red-colored hand prints on the interior walls.

Chi Chan Nah
Meaning: Small House

Constructed during: Post Classic

Location: to the East of Las Manitas

This building was an oratorio, or chapel, used by the family of the halach uinik who lived in the nearby residence of Las Manitas (see above).  It consisted of a large outer room with a small inner sanctum containing an altar.  In the nearby altar platform (named La Tumba) to the west of Las Manitas, a single vaulted-roofed tomb was discovered in 1973, the only one of its kind found in San Gervasio.

Ka'na Nah
Meaning: Tall House

Constructed during: Post-Classic (1200-1650 AD)

Location: West of the District 1 Central Plaza

This pyramid is the largest single structure in San Gervasio. Due to certain architectural arrangements in the interior of the small room on the top, this structure may have been the temple of Ixchel described in 1552 by Francisco Lopez de Gomara, when he wrote of a temple "where they kept a very strange idol, very distinct from the others.  The body of this great idol was hollow, made of baked clay and fastened to the wall with mortar, in back of which was something like a sacristy, where the priests had a small secret door cut into the side of the idol, into which one of them would enter, and from it speak to and answer those who came to worship and beg favors.  With this trickery, simple men were made to believe whatever the god told them."   In 1618, Diego Lopez de Cogolludo wrote that "they venerated the statue more than the others, sacrificing to it birds, dogs, their own blood, and even men."

El Arco

Meaning: The Arch

Constructed during: A reconstruction erected in the 1980s

Location: Northeast of District 1 Central Plaza

This arch is the main entrance from the north and west to San Gervasio’s District 1 Central Plaza Group. It is a simple arch about seven feet tall that straddles the main religious pathway (called a sacbe in Mayan, a word meaning "white road") running northeast from the plaza. It was reconstructed by INAH in the form of similar arches found at other sites on the east coast of Quintana Roo, such as El Cedral, located on the southern portion of Cozumel.

To the north of this arch, on the western edge of the religious pathway lies a small hole in the bedrock, similar to others that can be found throughout the ruins. These natural karst formations are called cenotes (from the Mayan word ‘’d'zonot’’) and served as water sources for the inhabitants of San Gervasio.

District 1 Central Plaza
Meaning:

Constructed during: Post-Classic (1200-1650 AD)

Location: Northwest of the entrance to the ruins

The Plaza Group consists of 6 buildings arranged in a square around a central altar platform. Several of these buildings once had roofs made of timber and thatch, which have since rotted away.  Others had roofs of wood beams and poured mortar, while a few had rooms constructed of corbeled arches.  All were public buildings and included temples, oratories, altars, and a building used to house visitors who came to participate in religious events taking place in the plaza.

Nohoch Nah
Meaning: Big House

Constructed during: Terminal-Classic (1000-1200 AD) and Post-Classic (1200-1650 AD)

Location: North of the District 1 Central Plaza

With its intact roof, this is one of the best preserved buildings in San Gervasio.  Inside, (closed off to the public, but visible through the doorway) the interior walls still show signs of a red, ochre and blue mural.  This building was a temple dedicated to Ku’kul’kan, the feathered serpent god.

Los Murcielagos
Meaning: The Bats

Constructed during: Late-Classic (600-1000 AD): Location: Northwest of District 1 Central Plaza

This compound is made up of several rooms and out-buildings situated on a platform and making up the residence of the halach uinik of Cozumel during the late Post-Classic Period.

References

The brochure provided by the park includes the link Cozumelparks.org .
Markers on sites at park

External links
 San Gervasio Photo Essay

Maya sites in Quintana Roo
Cozumel
Tourist attractions in Quintana Roo
Maya
Maya sites that survived the end of the Classic Period